The Ministry of Justice of Qatar is responsible for the following duties:

 Supervising the practice of law in Qatar
 Defending the federal government in cases that are filed against it
 Overseeing the registration of legal processes
 Reviewing contracts undertaken by other governmental bodies
 Increasing awareness of the law, providing legal training for government employees, and monitoring any law-related professions

List of ministers (Post-1971 upon achieving independence) 
 'Abd al-Rahman ibn Sa'ud al-Thani (1971-1975)*
 Ahmad bin Sayf Al Thani (1989-1994)
 Nayib Muhammad al-Nuaymi (1995-1997)
 Ahmad bin Muhammad Ali al-Subayi (1997-1999) [Acting]
 Hasan bin Abdallah al-Ghanim (2000-2012)
 Hassan Lahdan Saqr Al Mohannadi (2013–2018)
Issa bin Saad Al Jafali Al Nuaimi (2018–2021)
Masoud bin Mohammed Al Ameri (2021-present)

*The ministry post appears to have been vacant from 1975-1989, based on various sources.

See also 
 Justice ministry
 Politics of Qatar

References 

Justice ministries
Government of Qatar
Government ministries of Qatar